Palmetto Canning is a historic jam, jelly and sauce manufacturer in Palmetto, Florida. It was established in 1927 and has operated its plant in Palmetto since 1945. It also has a plant in Seffner, Florida. It produces private label products in glass and plastic containers. 

The company was founded by Capt. John Greenlaw
and has been owned and operated by the Greenlaw family since. 

Palmetto Canning is the parent company of De Vinco Company, a manufacturer of cooking wines based in Seffner, Florida.

References

External links
Palmetto Canning website

Food manufacturers of the United States